There are more than two hundred scheduled monuments in Cheshire, a county in North West England, which date from the Neolithic period to the middle of the 20th century.  This list includes the scheduled monuments in Cheshire dating from before the year 1066, the year accepted by Revealing Cheshire's Past as the start of the Medieval period.

A scheduled monument is a nationally important archaeological site or monument which is given legal protection by being placed on a list (or "schedule") by the Secretary of State for Culture, Media and Sport; English Heritage takes the leading role in identifying such sites.  The current legislation supporting this is the Ancient Monuments and Archaeological Areas Act 1979.  The term "monument" can apply to the whole range of archaeological sites, and they are not always visible above ground. Such sites have to have been deliberately constructed by human activity.  They range from prehistoric standing stones and burial sites, through Roman remains and medieval structures such as castles and monasteries, to later structures such as industrial sites and buildings constructed for the World Wars.

At least 84 monuments dating from before 1066 have been scheduled in Cheshire, the oldest probably being The Bridestones, a Neolithic long cairn.  The monument at Somerford is also thought to have been a long cairn and there is evidence of a Neolithic settlement at Tatton.  The Bronze Age is the period most strongly represented before 1066 with 44 monuments, almost all of which are round barrows.  Eleven Iron Age hillforts or promontory forts are scheduled.  The period of Roman rule left a variety of scheduled monuments, including the remains of settlements at Heronbridge and Wilderspool, and parts of Chester city walls.  Definite or possible Roman military camps have been revealed by aerial photography showing cropmarks and parchmarks.  The monuments remaining from the Dark Age and the Saxon period consist mainly of portions of crosses, and there is evidence of Saxon occupation of villages, now deserted, at Tatton and Baddiley.

Monuments

See also

List of scheduled monuments in Cheshire (1066–1539)
List of scheduled monuments in Cheshire since 1539
Grade I listed buildings in Cheshire

References

 
 
Scheduled
Cheshire